Claudin-18 is a protein that in humans is encoded by the CLDN18 gene. It belongs to the group of claudins.

CLDN18 belongs to the large claudin family of proteins, which form tight junction strands in epithelial cells . [supplied by OMIM]

Clinical significance
Isoform 2 (Claudin 18.2) is abundant in gastric tumors.

Experimental antibody IMAB362 targets Claudin 18.2 to help treat gastric cancers.

References

External links

Further reading